Boston Strangler is a 2023 American historical crime drama film written and directed by Matt Ruskin. It is based on the true story of the Boston Strangler, who in the 1960s killed 13 women in Boston. The film stars Keira Knightley as Loretta McLaughlin, the reporter who broke the story for the  Boston Record American. Carrie Coon, Alessandro Nivola, Chris Cooper, David Dastmalchian, and Morgan Spector co-star. Filming took place in Greater Boston from December 2021 to March 2022. The film was released on March 17, 2023, by Hulu.

Plot
In 1962, Boston Record American reporter Loretta McLaughlin investigates three cases of older women who were raped and murdered by strangulation in the Boston area. She confirms the victims all had stockings tied around their necks in a bow, likely connecting the crimes to a serial killer. The story angers Boston law enforcement and Loretta’s boss plans to kill the story to protect the paper.

However, when a fourth victim is found, Loretta and fellow reporter Jean Cole continue the investigation. The two women endure rampant sexism in their workplace and society in general. Loretta's marriage is strained by her long hours, and her family is increasingly harassed. While writing the articles, Loretta coins the name "the Boston Strangler.”

In 1963, a seventh woman named Sophie Clark is murdered. A neighbor encountered a man who could be the killer, and she provides a vague description. Sophie is much younger than previous victims, which breaks the Strangler’s pattern.

Loretta and Jean discover that the Boston Police Department is botching the investigation and not sharing information with other cities. This means similar murders, like one committed in New York City by a man named Patrick Dempsey, have been overlooked.

A suspect named Albert DeSalvo is taken into custody. Sophie Clark's neighbor is asked to identify him in a lineup, but she picks a different man, George Nassar. Despite this, in 1964, DeSalvo confesses to all 13 murders.

In 1965, Loretta learns there have been six murders in Ann Arbor, Michigan that are identical to the Boston Strangler’s work. The most likely suspect is Daniel Marsh, an ex-boyfriend of a Strangler victim. Before Loretta can meet DeSalvo to hear his side of the story, he is stabbed to death at Bridgewater State Hospital.

Following an anonymous tip, Loretta meets with Harrison, a former patient at Bridgewater. He reveals that DeSalvo, Marsh, and Nassar were all held in the same ward at the same time. Harrison also claims DeSalvo’s confession was coached by Marsh and Nassar.

Loretta and Jean create a theory: Paul Dempsey killed the first six older women in Boston before he moved to New York. Once Dempsey left Boston,  copycat murders arose, resulting in the later victims being much younger. DeSalvo confessed to all 13 murders so Nassar could collect a $10,000 reward per victim. In return, Nassar arranged for DeSalvo to be represented by high-profile lawyer F. Lee Bailey. DeSalvo was also deceived into believing he would get a million-dollar book deal that could support his family. The Record American publishes Loretta and Jean’s theory.

The epilogue tells of Loretta becoming an award-winning medical reporter at the Boston Globe. Jean continued working as a reporter for 30 years. She and Loretta remained close friends. Marsh was never charged with murder. Nassar remains in prison as of 2023, and never received any reward money. In 2013,  DNA evidence linked DeSalvo to the 13th murder, but not the other 12.

Cast

 Keira Knightley as Loretta McLaughlin
 Carrie Coon as Jean Cole
 Alessandro Nivola as Detective Conley
 Chris Cooper as Jack MacLaine
 David Dastmalchian as Albert DeSalvo
 Morgan Spector as Loretta's husband James
 Bill Camp as Commissioner Edmund McNamara
 Robert John Burke as Eddie Holland
 Rory Cochrane as Detective DeLine
 Pamela Jayne Morgan as Anne Samans
 Peter Gerety as Eddie Corsetti
 Greg Vrotsos as George Nassar
 Ryan Winkles as Daniel Marsh

Production
Boston Strangler is a co-production between Scott Free Productions, LuckyChap Entertainment, and 20th Century Studios. It was written and directed by Matt Ruskin, and produced by Ridley Scott, Kevin J. Walsh, Michael Pruss, Tom Ackerley, and Josey McNamara. On October 4, 2021, Keira Knightley joined the cast. In November 2021, Carrie Coon, Alessandro Nivola, Chris Cooper, and David Dastmalchian were added to the cast. Robert John Burke and Morgan Spector were confirmed to star in early 2022.

Ben Kutchins served as the film's cinematographer. Filming began on December 6, 2021. A house in Belmont, Massachusetts, stood in for the home of reporter Loretta McLaughlin. That same day, the Winn Brook Elementary School was transformed into the Cambridge Police Department for second unit filming. The school was paid $5,000 to be in the film. Several private driveways on Statler and Waterhouse Roads were rented to park 1960s vehicles. For the next two days, filming took place in the South End; scenes were shot on Dwight Street between Tremont Street and Shawmut Avenue. 

On December 9, the Benjamin Franklin Institute of Technology was temporarily turned into a police headquarters for the film. Between January 26 and January 27, 2022, the former Josephine M. Foster Elementary School in Braintree was used as a set. Filming also took place in Jamaica Plain, Lowell, Lynn, Malden, Roxbury, and Wellesley, Massachusetts. Several health procedures had to be followed due to the COVID-19 pandemic. The entire crew was vaccinated and tested for the virus three times a week until production concluded. Filming wrapped in March 2022. During post-production, Paul Leonard-Morgan composed the musical score.

Release
The film was released on March 17, 2023, by Hulu.

Reception 
 

Writing for The New York Times, Jeannette Catsoulis characterized the movie as "a dreary, painfully stylized slog". Kevin Slane writing for Boston.com was more generous, singling out Keira Knightley's performance: "Knightley is perfect in the role of McLaughlin, able to convey her dogged determination with a single steely glance." Nick Allen, writing for RogerEbert.com, said "Keira Knightley is a tenacious and compelling force". Several reviewers made unfavorable comparisons to the earlier The Boston Strangler (1968) or David Fincher's Seven (1995) and Zodiac (2007). Allen again: "the growing drabness of the movie, which is evident in a maudlin score heavy on somber strings and an absence of a distinct visual style that becomes increasingly glaring with each familiar sequence." In the U.K., The Guardian's Peter Bradshaw wrote "A director like Jonathan Demme or David Fincher would have gone for the jugular on this kind of material, but writer-director Matt Ruskin seems a little squeamish and keeps everything on the right side of contemporary taste. The chill of fear is missing."

References

External links
 
 

20th Century Studios films
American crime drama films
American films based on actual events
American serial killer films
Crime films based on actual events
Drama films based on actual events
Films about journalists
Films about real serial killers
Films produced by Tom Ackerley
Films scored by Paul Leonard-Morgan
Films set in Boston
Films set in the 1960s
Films shot in Boston
Films shot in Massachusetts
Hulu original films
LuckyChap Entertainment films
Scott Free Productions films